Albert H. Johnson (1 May 1931 – 20 May 2011) was a British racewalker. He competed in the men's 50 kilometres walk at the 1956 Summer Olympics and the 1960 Summer Olympics.

References

External links
 

1931 births
2011 deaths
Athletes (track and field) at the 1956 Summer Olympics
Athletes (track and field) at the 1960 Summer Olympics
Athletes (track and field) at the 1966 British Empire and Commonwealth Games
British male racewalkers
Olympic athletes of Great Britain
Place of birth missing
Commonwealth Games competitors for the Isle of Man